Ofori Panyin I is commonly known as the founder of the Akyem State, afterwards Kyebi located in the valley of the Birim river after 1727. He ruled from 1704 to 1727.

References 

Ghanaian leaders
African monarchs
18th-century Ghanaian people
Ghanaian royalty
People from Eastern Region (Ghana)